This is a list of contestants who have appeared on The Amazing Race Australia, an Australian reality game show based on the American series, The Amazing Race. A total of 158 contestants have appeared in the series.

Contestants

Season 1 (2010)

Season 2 (2011)

Season 3 (2014)

Season 4 (2019)

Season 5 (2021)

Season 6 (2022)

Gallery

See also
 List of The Amazing Race Australia winners

References

Australian television-related lists
Amazing Race Australia contestants, The

id:Templat:The Amazing Race
vi:Tiêu bản:Tóm tắt The Amazing Race